Operation Sand Flea was a series of training exercises for the December 1989 invasion of Panama by the United States. These troop movements and practice assaults were conducted in part as training to defend the Panama Canal (a contingency then called Purple Storm), but were also intended simply to affirm the right of the US military to engage in them. Conducted in the summer of 1989, these seemingly endless movements, also known as "Freedom of Movement Drills," overwhelmed the ability of the Panamanians to observe, analyze and understand the activities. In this way, this program desensitized the Panama Defense Force (PDF) to the coming invasion.

The exercises were part of Operation Nimrod Dancer.

See also
Operation Purple Storm

References 

Conflicts in 1989
History of Panama
20th-century military history of the United States